Shankhachil (Brahminy kite) is a 2016 India-Bangladesh joint venture Bengali-language historical Drama film, written by Sayantani Putatunda, starring Prosenjit, Kusum Sikder, Shajbati and directed by Goutam Ghose. This film is named after the bird Brahminy kite which is used by many Bengali poets like Jibanananda Das.

Shankhachil was well received by Upam Buzarbaruah, writing in The Times of India. It won the Best Feature Film in Bengali award at 63rd National Film Awards. It was also selected for the Montreal World Film Festival.

Plot
It is a story of a simple village couple from Bangladesh who come to Taki for the treatment of their ailing daughter named Rupsha. Their life and struggle are portrayed in the film.

Cast
 Prosenjit Chatterjee as Muntasir Chowdhury Badal
 Kusum Sikder as Laila
 Shajbati as Rupsha
 Shahed Ali
 Ushasie Chakraborty
 Priyanshu Chatterjee as BSF officer Ravi Verma (cameo)
 Deepankar De
 Prabir Mitra
 Mamunur Rashid
 Rajesh Shinde
 Rosey Siddiqui
 Arindam Sil
 Nakul Vaid

Awards and nominations

References 

Bengali-language Indian films
Bengali-language Bangladeshi films
2016 films
Indian historical drama films
Bangladeshi historical drama films
Best Bengali Feature Film National Film Award winners
2010s Bengali-language films
Films directed by Goutam Ghose